"Ich hab' Dich lieb" (English: I love you) is the second hit single released by Schnuffel, on 4 July 2008, by Sony BMG Germany (Sony BMG). It's the first track in the homonym album, Ich hab' Dich lieb and Ich hab' Dich lieb Gold Edition. The CD-single sold over 50,000 copies. The song is also present in a digital release called "Häschenparty - Famous 5" (released on October 24, 2008) as the 4th track.

Track listing

"Ich hab' Dich lieb" – 3:24
"Ich hab' Dich lieb" (enhanced videoclip) – 3:24

International editions
 2008: I love you so (English version) (by Snuggle) 
 2008: Jag är så kär! (Swedish version) (by Kramis) 
 2008: Szívemből szól (Hungarian version) (by Snufi) 
 2008: Gosto de ti (Portuguese version) (by Orelhinhas) 
 2009: Je t'aime tellement (French version) (by Lapin Câlin)

Charts

References

2008 singles
Schnuffel songs
2008 songs